This was the first edition of the tournament for since 2012, Dudi Sela and Amir Weintraub won the title defeating Nikola Mektić and Franko Škugor in the final 6–3, 3–6, [10–6].

Seeds

Draw

References
 Main Draw

Ningbo Challenger - Doubles